Hrušky is the name of several locations in the Czech Republic:

 Hrušky (Břeclav District), a village in the South Moravian Region
 Hrušky (Vyškov District), a village in the South Moravian Region
 Hrušky oil field, an oil field in Hrušky (Vyškov District)